Gerald A. Caravelli (July 25, 1943 – February 29, 2012) was an American bridge player. He was from Des Plaines, Illinois and was an accountant.

Bridge accomplishments

Wins

 North American Bridge Championships (7)
 Rockwell Mixed Pairs (1) 1974 
 Silodor Open Pairs (1) 1982 
 Wernher Open Pairs (1) 1976 
 Grand National Teams (2) 1978, 1995 
 Keohane North American Swiss Teams (1) 1996 
 Chicago Mixed Board-a-Match (1) 1975

Runners-up

 North American Bridge Championships
 Leventritt Silver Ribbon Pairs (3) 1999, 2000, 2001 
 Silodor Open Pairs (1) 1984 
 Grand National Teams (2) 1984, 1988 
 Vanderbilt (1) 1977 
 Keohane North American Swiss Teams (3) 1979, 1988, 1989 
 Mitchell Board-a-Match Teams (1) 1971 
 Chicago Mixed Board-a-Match (1) 1980

References

External links
 

1943 births
2012 deaths
American contract bridge players
People from Des Plaines, Illinois
Place of birth missing
Place of death missing